Bernard Brégeon (born 6 July 1962) is a French sprint canoeist who competed in the 1980s. Competing in two Summer Olympics, he won two medals at Los Angeles in 1984 with a silver in the K-2 1000 m and a bronze in the K-1 500 m events.

Brégeon also won a complete set of  medals at the ICF Canoe Sprint World Championships with a gold (K-2 10000 m: 1982), a silver (K-1 10000 m: 1986) and a bronze (K-1 500 m: 1985).

He is married to fellow canoer Bernadette Brégeon.

References

1962 births
Canoeists at the 1984 Summer Olympics
Canoeists at the 1988 Summer Olympics
French male canoeists
Living people
Olympic canoeists of France
Olympic silver medalists for France
Olympic bronze medalists for France
Olympic medalists in canoeing
ICF Canoe Sprint World Championships medalists in kayak
Medalists at the 1984 Summer Olympics
20th-century French people